The northern leaf-tailed gecko (Saltuarius cornutus) is a species of the genus Saltuarius, the Australian leaf-tailed geckos.

Description
Saltuarius cornutus is a large gecko with a triangular head, narrow neck, a body length to 14 cm and an 8 cm broad, leaf-like tail. Unlike most geckos, it has clawed toes and no adhesive discs, probably due to its arboreal lifestyle. Body is flattened and limbs are long and spindly; dorsal surface bears sharply pointed tubercles (its eponymous "horns"). Camouflage coloration strongly resembles lichen-mottled bark. Its scientific name translates to "Horned Keeper of the Forest".

Habitat
Nocturnal tree dweller in warm temperate and tropical rainforests and wet sclerophyll forests, typically above 750m, in the Coastal and Great Dividing Ranges in NE Queensland and south to Taree in New South Wales.

Behaviour
Active at night and in cool conditions when most reptiles rest. When threatened, the gecko arches its back, raises and wags its tail from side to side to draw attention away from the head- if attacked it will readily shed its tail and grow another; however the new tail will be broader and flatter with different coloration and a short tip. Also known to open mouth and charge aggressors while vocalizing.  Females lay 1–2 parchment-shelled eggs in a shallow nest covered with leaf litter and soil—up to 14 eggs from multiple females have been found in a single communal nest.

Diet
The Northern leaf-tailed gecko eats large insects and other arthropods, including cockroaches and spiders.

References

External links
 Queensland Museum

Saltuarius
Geckos of Australia
Reptiles of Queensland
Endemic fauna of Australia
Reptiles described in 1892
Taxa named by James Douglas Ogilby